Beryllium oxalate is an inorganic compound, a salt of beryllium metal and oxalic acid with the chemical formula . It forms colorless crystals, dissolves in water, and also forms crystalline hydrates. The compound is used to prepare ultra-pure beryllium oxide by thermal decomposition.

Synthesis
The action of oxalic acid on beryllium hydroxide:

Chemical properties 
Crystalline hydrates lose water when heated:

References

Inorganic compounds
Beryllium compounds
Oxalates